Pir Nazeer Ahmed was the eldest son of Baba Ji Muhammad Qasim Sadiq who was the founder of Mohra Sharif and also successor of Baba Ji (appointed by Ghous-ul-Azam Sheikh Abdul Qadir Jilani). Pir Nazeer Ahmed was born in 1880. His education started at an early age. Because formal schooling was not available in the area, various scholars were invited to Mohra Sharif to teach him Persian, Urdu, Islamic Studies, Arabic, Sarf, Nahv, Hadith, Fiqh and other traditional subjects. Along with these, he was also trained in riding, swordsmanship and lancing.

In 1892, when he was 12 years of age, his father Baba Ji Muhammad Qasim Sadiq took him to Kahyian Sharif to meet with Khwaja Nizam ad Din. During his first meeting with the Sheikh, Pir Nazeer Ahmed was given the Khilafat by the great Sheikh and Khwaja Nizam ad Din said to him ({Pir Nazeer Ahmed}) that your 7 posterities will be Wali ALLAH and that he instructed his father Baba Ji Muhammad Qasim Sadiq that he (Pir Nazeer Ahmed) will be his (Khwaja Nizam ad Din's) heir and he (Pir Nazeer Ahmed) will be Mujadid of his era.

After returning from Kahiyan Sharif, he again went back to his studies and after sometime went into solitude in the neighboring Jungle. This routine, he continued for twelve years. During this time, he was married and his eldest son Mubarak Khan was born. Because his inclination was more towards solitude, the marriage did not work out and in 1906 he separated from his wife.

In the meantime, he continued his education and Maulvi Ghulam Muhammad of Dandot stayed at Mohra Sharif for a year to teach him the complex matters of Islamic studies. Later two scholars Maulana Ghulam Kibriya Khan of Bihar and Maulana Abd ar Rehman stayed at Mohra Sharif and completed his formal education.

References
 Sufi Muhammad Rasheed (2006). Nisbat-e-Rasooli.  Maktaba Nisbat-e-Rasooli.
 http://www.mohrasharif.com.pk
 https://web.archive.org/web/20100130141901/http://www.nisbat-e-rasooli.info/

Naqshbandi order
Indian Sufi religious leaders
1880 births
1960 deaths